Kavassery is a gram panchayat in the Palakkad district, state of Kerala, India. It is a very local government organisation that serves the villages of Kavasseri-I and Kavasseri-II.

Its postal code is from 678543 to 678545.

Demographics

 India census, Kavasseri-I had a population of 15,564 with 7,458 males and 8,106 females.

 India census, Kavasseri-II had a population of 11,275 with 5,388 males and 5,887 females.

References 

Gram panchayats in Palakkad district